Vandiemenia ratkowskiana is the only species of liverwort in the genus Vandiemenia. It is endemic to Tasmania, Australia. Its natural habitat is subtropical or tropical dry forests.

References

Metzgeriales
Critically endangered flora of Australia
Flora of Tasmania
Taxonomy articles created by Polbot
Liverwort genera
Monotypic bryophyte genera